Humbertiella may refer to:

 Humbertiella Saussure, 1869 – a genus of insects in the family Liturgusidae
 Humbertiella (plant) Hochr. – a genus of plants in the family Malvaceae